XHUAT-FM is a radio station on 103.1 FM in Santa María Huatulco, Oaxaca. It is owned by Grupo Oro Esmeralda and carries a local full service format.

History
XHUAT received its concession on April 1, 1992. The concessionaire is a broadcast lawyer associated most closely with Radiorama.

References

Radio stations in Oaxaca